Qasr Chbib is a complex of two Roman temples situated a few hundred meters from the summit of Mount Hermon. Officially in the Quneitra District of Syria, Web mapping shows the ruins to be in the Hasbaya District of the Nabatieh Governorate in Lebanon.

Both of the sanctuaries have northern walls that were carved out of solid bedrock. The western temple has an area at the back in place of an Adyton that was also hewn out of the rock escarpment. Kevin Butcher suggested that this design was employed to bring the temples "closer to the gods".

References

External links
Rashaya seen from the summit of Mount Hermon on padpal.co
Qasr Chbib on geographic.org
Photos of Roman temples in the Rashaya area on the American University of Beirut website
Roman Temples on discoverlebanon.com
Qasr Chbib on itouchmap.com
3D map of Qasr Chbib on gmap3d.com
Qasr Chbib on mapatlas.org

Hasbaya District
Archaeological sites in Nabatieh Governorate
Archaeological sites in Lebanon
Ancient Roman temples
Roman sites in Lebanon
Roman sites in Syria
Tourist attractions in Lebanon
Tourist attractions in Syria